Carol Romano is an American public health nurse who is a former Assistant Surgeon General and Chief Nursing Officer for the United States Public Health Service (PHS). Romano holds the rank of Rear Admiral in the United States Public Health Service Commissioned Corps. In 2011, she became associate dean of Academic Affairs for the Uniformed Services University of the Health Sciences Graduate School of Nursing.

Her awards from the PHS include the Meritorious Service Medal, three Outstanding Service Medals, and a Commendation Medal and two Achievement Medals.

References 

Year of birth missing (living people)
Living people
United States Public Health Service personnel
American nurses
American women nurses
Place of birth missing (living people)
United States Public Health Service Commissioned Corps admirals
Uniformed Services University of the Health Sciences faculty
American women academics
21st-century American women